What's the Time Mr Wolf? is the debut album by Noisettes. It was released on 5 February 2007 in the United Kingdom on Vertigo Records (supported by an extensive UK tour) and on 17 April 2007 in the United States on Universal Records. Five singles have been released from the album: "IWE", "Scratch Your Name", "Don't Give Up" and "Sister Rosetta (Capture The Spirit)" and their final single, "The Count of Monte Christo". The album was recorded over a period of two years, in various studios in Croydon, England and in Los Angeles and Sausalito, California. It peaked at #75 on the UK Albums Chart.

Track listing

Critical response

New Yorker called the album "a smart, relentlessly exuberant thirty-eight-minute demonstration of chutzpah and musicianship, despite the band's affinity with the fizzy amateur energy of punk." Rolling Stone called the band on this album "three bad-news London kids who came to knock you out, take your money and blow your mind," and gave the album three-and-a-half stars. Entertainment Weekly said that Shoniwa's "show-offy noodling derails the last few cuts, but when the Noisettes connect, they're a euphoric mix of Bow Wow Wow and the Yeah Yeah Yeahs."

References

2007 debut albums
Noisettes albums
Vertigo Records albums